Heredity is a 1912 American drama film directed by  D. W. Griffith.

Cast
 Harry Carey - White Renegade Father
 Madge Kirby - Indian Mother
 Jack Pickford - Son of White Renegade Father and Indian Mother
 Walter P. Lewis - Indian Chief
 Kate Bruce - Indian Woman
 Lionel Barrymore - Woodsman
 W. Christy Cabanne - Indian
 Robert Harron - Indian
 George Nichols
 Alfred Paget - Indian/Woodsman
 W. C. Robinson - Indian
 Hector Sarno - Indian (as Hector V. Sarno)
 Marion Sunshine
 Kate Toncray

See also
 Harry Carey filmography
 D. W. Griffith filmography
 Lionel Barrymore filmography

References

External links

1912 films
1912 drama films
1912 short films
Silent American drama films
American silent short films
American black-and-white films
Films directed by D. W. Griffith
1910s American films